
Gmina Wąsosz is a rural gmina (administrative district) in Grajewo County, Podlaskie Voivodeship, in north-eastern Poland.

Villages
Gmina Wąsosz contains the villages and settlements of Bagienice, Bukowo Duże, Jaki, Kędziorowo, Kolonia-Gródź, Kolonia-Łazy, Kolonie-Ławsk, Komosewo, Kudłaczewo, Ławsk, Łempice, Modzele, Niebrzydy, Nieciki, Sulewo-Kownaty, Sulewo-Prusy, Szymany, Wąsosz, Zalesie and Żebry.

Neighbouring gminas
Gmina Wąsosz is bordered by the gminas of Grabowo, Grajewo, Przytuły, Radziłów and Szczuczyn.

References

Polish official population figures 2006

Wasosz
Grajewo County